The 1921 Notre Dame Fighting Irish football team represented the University of Notre Dame during the 1921 college football season, led by fourth-year head coach Knute Rockne.

Back John Mohardt led the team to a 10–1 record with 781 rushing yards, 995 passing yards, 12 rushing touchdowns, and nine passing touchdowns.  Grantland Rice wrote that "Mohardt could throw the ball to within a foot or two of any given space" and noted that the 1921 Notre Dame team "was the first team we know of to build its attack around a forward passing game, rather than use a forward passing game as a mere aid to the running game."

Schedule

References

Notre Dame
Notre Dame Fighting Irish football seasons
Notre Dame Fighting Irish football